Paolo Lorenzi and Potito Starace were the defending champions, but decided not to participate together.  Lorenzi played alongside Filippo Volandri, but lost in the quarterfinals to Oliver Marach and Florin Mergea.   Starace teamed up with Daniele Bracciali, but lost in the quarterfinals to Marcel Granollers and Marc López.
Marach and Mergea won the title, defeating Juan Sebastián Cabal and Robert Farah in the final, 6–3, 6–4.

Seeds

Draw

References
 Main Draw

Royal Guard Open - Doubles
2014 Doubles